The Annandale and Eskdale District Council election took place in May 1992, alongside elections to the councils of Scotland's various other districts. This was the last election before the District council model of local government was abolished in favour of regional councils.

The SNP didn't field any candidates in this election.

9 seats were uncontested in this election.

References

1992 Scottish local elections